Reilly Opelka (born August 28, 1997) is an American professional tennis player. At 6 feet 11 inches tall, he is tied (with Ivo Karlović) for the  tallest-ever ATP-ranked player, and can produce serves that measure over 140 mph. He has been ranked as high as World No. 17 in singles by the ATP, which he achieved on February 28, 2022, and in doubles as world No. 89 on August 2, 2021. He has won four ATP singles titles and one doubles title. He is a junior Wimbledon champion.

Personal life
Opelka was born in St. Joseph, Michigan and moved to Palm Coast, Florida at age 4. He didn't start playing tennis regularly until he began training through USTA in Boca Raton at 12 years old. He credits Tom Gullikson, whom his father knew from playing golf, for much of his early development as a tennis player. Opelka is close friends with Taylor Fritz and was the best man at Fritz's wedding. His uncle is radio talk show host Mike Opelka.

Junior career
Opelka won the 2015 Junior Wimbledon tournament, defeating Junior world No. 1 Taylor Fritz en route to beating Mikael Ymer in the final and reached the finals of the Boys' Doubles event (with Akira Santillan) at the 2015 Wimbledon Championships.

Professional career

Early years

Opelka made his ATP debut at the 2016 U.S. Men's Clay Court Championships, where he lost in the first round to fifth seed Sam Querrey. In August, Opelka won his first three career ATP matches at the Atlanta Open to reach the semifinals at just his third career ATP event. This included a victory over 203 cm player No. 27 Kevin Anderson in which he saved two match points on Anderson's serve. He lost in the semi-finals to top seed John Isner. He continued his momentum with first round wins at the Los Cabos Open and the Cincinnati Masters where he defeated Sergiy Stakhovsky and Jérémy Chardy respectively to move into the top 300 of the ATP rankings. After struggling with a foot injury towards the end of the summer, Opelka returned to the USTA Pro Circuit for the indoor season and won his first ATP Challenger title in Charlottesville to finish the year just outside the top 200.

In 2017, Opelka got off to a good start to the season by qualifying for the Australian Open. He played No. 11 seed David Goffin in the first round and pushed him to five sets before taking the loss. At the Memphis Open, he recorded his only ATP Tour level win of the year over fellow Next Gen American Jared Donaldson.

2018: Breakthrough, top 100 year-end ranking 
2018 proved to be a breakthrough year for Opelka. He won three ATP Challenger titles in the season, the first American to do so since Bradley Klahn in 2014. He won his first title of the season at the Bordeaux Challenger in May. In November, he won back to back titles at the Knoxville Challenger and the JSM Challenger. He also finished as a runner-up at Cary Challenger and Oracle Challenger.

On the ATP World Tour, he reached the quarterfinals at the Delray Beach Open, picking up his first top 10 win of his burgeoning career, defeating world No. 8, Jack Sock, in the second round.

His solid performance on the ATP Challenger Tour earned him his first top-100 year-end finish in singles, ending the season at world No. 99.

2019: First ATP title, top 50 debut
At the Australian Open, Opelka upset compatriot John Isner in the first round. This was the second top 10 win of his career. In February, Opelka again defeated Isner en route to his first ATP title, the New York Open. At Wimbledon in July, he achieved his best Grand Slam result to date, making it to the tournament's third round and defeating Stan Wawrinka in the process. Over the summer and fall, he reached the semifinals of tournaments in Atlanta, Tokyo, and Basel. In November, he participated in the Davis Cup Finals for the United States, ultimately losing both his rubbers. He finished the season ranked 36th in the world.

2020: Second ATP title, Masters 1000 quarterfinal
In February, Opelka lifted his second career trophy, at the Delray Beach Open. After an extended break due to the ongoing COVID-19 pandemic, play resumed and Opelka reached his first ATP Tour Masters level quarterfinal at the Cincinnati Masters. En route he earned his fifth career top 10 win, defeating Matteo Berrettini.

2021: US Open fourth round, Masters 1000 final, top 20 debut
Opelka chose not to defend his Delray Beach title. He instead began the season at the Great Ocean Road Open as the sixth seed, but lost to Botic van de Zandschulp in the second round. At the Australian Open, he beat Lu Yen-hsun before losing to 27th seed Taylor Fritz, despite holding match points in the fourth set.

In Rome, Opelka beat Richard Gasquet, Lorenzo Musetti, Aslan Karatsev and Federico Delbonis to reach his first Masters semifinal, where he lost to Rafael Nadal.

Seeded 32nd at the French Open, Opelka beat clay-court specialists Andrej Martin and Jaume Munar to reach the third round, his best showing at this Grand Slam event, where he lost to Daniil Medvedev.

Partnering Jannik Sinner, he won his first doubles title at the Atlanta Open defeating Steve Johnson and Jordan Thompson. As a result he entered the top 100 in doubles at No. 89 on August 2, 2021. At the same tournament in singles he fell in the quarterfinals to Taylor Fritz.

At the Canada Masters in Toronto, he reached his second Masters 1000 semifinal by defeating Nick Kyrgios, 14th seed Grigor Dimitrov, Lloyd Harris and 10th seed Roberto Bautista Agut. He then upset 3rd seed and world No. 3, Stefanos Tsitsipas, to reach his first ATP Masters 1000 final. It was also his first win over a top 5 player. Opelka would lose to 1st seed and world No. 2 Daniil Medvedev in the final. With this successful run, he entered the top 25 in the ATP singles rankings for the first time at world No. 23 on August 16, 2021.

At the US Open, Opelka reached the fourth round of a Major for the first time in his career. There, he lost to Lloyd Harris in four sets. From this run, he cracked the top 20 in the ATP singles rankings for the first time at world No. 19 on September 13, 2021.

2022: Third and Fourth ATP titles, Hiatus
At the 2022 Australian Open, Opelka reached the third round, where he lost to Denis Shapovalov.

At the inaugural edition of the Dallas Open, Opelka won his third singles title after defeating Jenson Brooksby. In the semifinals, he defeated fellow American John Isner 7–6(9–7), 7–6(24–22). The 46-point tiebreak in the second set was the longest-ever at the ATP Tour level. At the 2022 Delray Beach Open, Opelka reached his second final in as many weeks, losing to Cameron Norrie. As a result he reached a new career-high ranking of world No. 18 on February 21, 2022 and world No. 17 a week later.
At the 2022 BNP Paribas Open he reached the fourth round for the first time in his career at this Masters where he lost to fourth seed Rafael Nadal.

At the 2022 U.S. Men's Clay Court Championships, Opelka won his second title of the year and fourth of his career, defeating compatriot John Isner in what was the tallest ATP Tour final in the Open Era.

At the 2022 Mutua Madrid Open, Opelka lost to Sebastian Korda, at the 2022 Italian Open to Stan Wawrinka, and at the 2022 French Open to Filip Krajinović with all losses being in the first round.

2023: Hiatus, out of top 100

Performance timelines

Singles
Current through the 2022 Citi Open.

Doubles

Significant finals

Masters 1000 finals

Singles: 1 (1 runner-up)

ATP career finals

Singles: 6 (4 titles, 2 runner-ups)

Doubles: 4 (1 title, 3 runner-ups)

ATP Challenger and ITF Futures finals

Singles: 6 (4 titles, 2 runner-ups)

Doubles: 1 (1 runner-up)

Junior Grand Slam finals

Boys' singles: 1 (1 title)

Boys' doubles: 1 (1 runner–ups)

Record against top 10 players

Opelka's match record against players who have been ranked in the top 10. Only ATP Tour main-draw and Davis Cup matches are considered. Players who have been No. 1 are in boldface.

  John Isner 5–1
  Kevin Anderson 2–0
  Diego Schwartzman 2–1
  Jack Sock 2–1
  Roberto Bautista Agut 2–2
  Matteo Berrettini 1–0
  Pablo Carreño Busta 1–0
  Richard Gasquet 1–0
  Ernests Gulbis 1–0
  Gilles Simon 1–0
  Grigor Dimitrov 1–1
  Milos Raonic 1–1
  Denis Shapovalov 1–1
  Stefanos Tsitsipas 1–1
  Stan Wawrinka 1–1
  Fabio Fognini 1–2
  David Goffin 1–2
  Cameron Norrie 1–2
  Daniil Medvedev 1–4
  Taylor Fritz 1–5
  Félix Auger-Aliassime 0–1
  Juan Martín del Potro 0–1
  Tommy Haas 0–1
  Gaël Monfils 0–1
  Andy Murray 0–1
  Kei Nishikori 0–1
  Jannik Sinner 0–1
  Dominic Thiem 0–1
  Jo-Wilfried Tsonga 0–1
  Rafael Nadal 0–2
  Casper Ruud 0–4

* .

Top 10 wins
 Opelka has a  record against players who were, at the time the match was played, ranked in the top 10.

* .

Notes

References

External links

 
 
 

1997 births
Living people
American male tennis players
Wimbledon junior champions
People from St. Joseph, Michigan
Grand Slam (tennis) champions in boys' singles
Tennis people from Florida